The 2006–07 season was the second season of competitive football played by Central Coast Mariners. The club ended the 2006–07 A-League in sixth, and so did not qualify for the finals. They failed to retain their A-League Pre-Season Challenge Cup title, losing to Adelaide United in the final.

In the transfer window, Central Coast signed Australian international Tony Vidmar and defender Vuko Tomasevic. The short term contracts of Brad Porter and Jamie McMaster were also extended.

The Mariners began the season in good form and reached the final of the 2006 A-League Pre-Season Challenge Cup. However, they failed to retain the title after losing in a penalty shoot-out to Adelaide United. The team were winless for the first five games of the A-League season, before a resurgent period featuring only two losses, to Adelaide Newcastle Jets in eleven games. However, the team failed to win any of its final five games and missed the finals series by five points as a result. Central Coast's top goalscorer was Adam Kwasnik, who scored nine goals.

Background

Transfers
On the back of the Mariners' highly successful first season, expectation arose as to the big-name players that could potentially join Central Coast. There were strong rumors about Stan Lazaridis, Ned Zelic and Paul Okon coming to the Mariners, but none eventuated. However, on 3 August 2006 Tony Vidmar announced he was joining the Mariners, signing a two-year deal. Vidmar was the Mariners' first marquee signing.

In

Out

Pre-season
The Mariners competed in the QNI North Queensland Trophy against A-League club Melbourne Victory, Chinese Super League team Changchun Yatai and the Young Socceroos finishing a respectable third.

The Mariners also played two friendly matches prior to the season commencing.

Squad

 Short term deal 15/07/06-19/08/06
Short term deal 22/07/06-19/08/06
 Short term deals 12/08/06, 12/11/06-11/01/07 
 Short term deals 12/08/06, 05/05/07-21/01/07
 Short term deal 06/10/06 - 19/11/06
 Short term deal

Coaching staff

Football Manager: Lawrie McKinna
Head Coach: Ian Ferguson
Development Manager: Alex Tobin
Strength & Conditioning: Andrew Clark

Pre-Season Cup

Group stage
The Mariners were put in Group A, along with Adelaide United (3rd in 2005-06 A-League season), Perth Glory (5th) and Melbourne Victory (7th). They had two home games in the three-game round-robin series, with one played at Wade Park, Orange, New South Wales, against Adelaide United, and the other at their traditional home, Central Coast Stadium.
Central Coast started their defence of the Pre-Season Cup well, defeating Perth Glory - the team they defeated in the 2005 Pre-Season Cup final - 2–1 at Central Coast Stadium, Gosford in front of 5,682 spectators. Both Central Coast strikers, Stewart Petrie and Adam Kwasnik, scored early goals. They followed this up with a gritty nil-all draw at Wade Park against last year's minor premiers, Adelaide United. Coach McKinna said after the game he was, "quite contented with the result". For their final Group A game, they travelled to Melbourne's Olympic Park, where they downed the Melbourne Victory 3–1, with Adam Kwasnik, Paul O'Grady and Noel Spencer all scoring for the Mariners.
Central Coast played their "bonus" fourth group-crossover round against the Queensland Roar. The "bonus" round awarded "bonus points" based on goals scored (one point for two goals, two points for three goals and three points for four or more goals). On this occasion, the Mariners and Roar drew 0–0, and both earned the conventional one point for a draw.

Finals
Finishing on top of Group A, with Adelaide United relegated to second on goal differential, the Mariners took on the Newcastle Jets in a fiery local derby in the playoff stage. Newcastle took the lead in the 25th minute, before Stewart Petrie converted a penalty in the 53rd minute. The game progressed into extra time, and a 96th-minute header from Paul O'Grady gave the Mariners a chance to defend their Pre-Season title in what was their fourth consecutive domestic final in as many competition entries.

In the grand final, they lost to Adelaide United 5-4 on penalties, after the score was tied 1-1 after extra time. Carl Veart scored early for Adelaide before the Mariners levelled in the 77th minute through attacking midfielder Andre Gumprecht. In the penalty shootout, Stewart Petrie was the only player to miss on either side, hitting the crossbar.

2006-07 Hyundai A-League fixtures

Table

Results summary

Player statistics
The Mariners used a total of 23 players during the 2006–07 season and there were nine different goalscorers. There were also two squad members who did not make a first-team appearance in the campaign. Alex Wilkinson and Adam Kwasnik both featured in all 27 competitive matches the side played in the campaign.

The team scored a total of 30 goals in all competitions. The highest scorere was Kwasnik, with nine goals, followed by Damian Mori who scored six goals. Mile Jedinak was the only player sent off in the season.

Key

No. = Squad number

Pos = Playing position

Nat. = Nationality

Apps = Appearances

GK = Goalkeeper

DF = Defender

MF = Midfielder

FW = Forward

 = Yellow cards

 = Red cards

Numbers in parentheses denote appearances as substitute. Players with number struck through and marked  left the club during the playing season.

References

External links

Central Coast Mariners FC seasons
Central Coast Mariners Season, 2006-07